Graphogastrini is a tribe of flies in the family Tachinidae.

Genera
Graphogaster Rondani, 1868
Phytomyptera Rondani, 1845

References

Diptera of Europe
Tachininae
Brachycera tribes